Manutūkē is a settlement in the Gisborne District of New Zealand's North Island. It is located to the west of the city of Gisborne on State Highway 2, close to the mouth of the Waipaoa River.

The name was officially modified to include macrons in 2021.

Demographics
It is part of the wider Te Arai statistical area.

Manutūkē had a population of 399 at the 2018 New Zealand census, an increase of 15 people (3.9%) since the 2013 census, and a decrease of 21 people (−5.0%) since the 2006 census. There were 147 households, comprising 198 males and 207 females, giving a sex ratio of 0.96 males per female, with 69 people (17.3%) aged under 15 years, 57 (14.3%) aged 15 to 29, 201 (50.4%) aged 30 to 64, and 72 (18.0%) aged 65 or older.

Ethnicities were 41.4% European/Pākehā, 71.4% Māori, 3.8% Pacific peoples, and 1.5% other ethnicities. People may identify with more than one ethnicity.

Although some people chose not to answer the census's question about religious affiliation, 34.6% had no religion, 47.4% were Christian, 9.0% had Māori religious beliefs and 0.8% had other religions.

Of those at least 15 years old, 57 (17.3%) people had a bachelor's or higher degree, and 75 (22.7%) people had no formal qualifications. 30 people (9.1%) earned over $70,000 compared to 17.2% nationally. The employment status of those at least 15 was that 165 (50.0%) people were employed full-time, 48 (14.5%) were part-time, and 21 (6.4%) were unemployed.

Te Arai statistical area

Te Arai had a population of 1,128 at the 2018 New Zealand census, an increase of 72 people (6.8%) since the 2013 census, and a decrease of 51 people (−4.3%) since the 2006 census. There were 399 households, comprising 573 males and 555 females, giving a sex ratio of 1.03 males per female. The median age was 40.8 years (compared with 37.4 years nationally), with 234 people (20.7%) aged under 15 years, 183 (16.2%) aged 15 to 29, 531 (47.1%) aged 30 to 64, and 177 (15.7%) aged 65 or older.

Ethnicities were 54.3% European/Pākehā, 59.3% Māori, 2.1% Pacific peoples, 0.3% Asian, and 1.9% other ethnicities. People may identify with more than one ethnicity.

The percentage of people born overseas was 5.9, compared with 27.1% nationally.

Although some people chose not to answer the census's question about religious affiliation, 46.5% had no religion, 37.8% were Christian, 6.9% had Māori religious beliefs, 0.3% were Buddhist and 1.1% had other religions.

Of those at least 15 years old, 135 (15.1%) people had a bachelor's or higher degree, and 192 (21.5%) people had no formal qualifications. The median income was $30,300, compared with $31,800 nationally. 105 people (11.7%) earned over $70,000 compared to 17.2% nationally. The employment status of those at least 15 was that 477 (53.4%) people were employed full-time, 144 (16.1%) were part-time, and 48 (5.4%) were unemployed.

Parks

Te Araroa Domain is Manutuke's sports ground.

Marae

The area has four marae belonging to the hapū of Rongowhakaata:
 Manutuke Marae and Te Poho o Rukupo or Te Poho o Epeha meeting house is a meeting place of Ngāti Kaipoho.
 Ohako Marae and Te Kiko o te Rangi meeting house is a meeting place of Ngāi Tāwhiri and Ruapani.
 Pāhou Marae and Te Poho o Taharakau meeting house is a meeting place of Ngāti Maru.
 Whakato Marae and Te Mana o Turanga meeting house is also a meeting place of Ngāti Maru.

In October 2020, the Government committed $1,466,370 from the Provincial Growth Fund to upgrade Ohako Marae, Pāhou Marae and Whakato Marae, creating an estimated 35 jobs. It also committed $1,686,254 to upgrade Manutuke Marae and 5 other Rongowhakaata marae, creating an estimated 41 jobs.

Education

It was established as Te Arai Native School in 1885. In 2020 it became a designated charter school, teaching partly in the Māori language. It catered for years 1 to 8 until term 2 of 2022. A proposal that it become a year 1 to 13 composite school has been made

Notable people
 

Petera Te Hiwirori Maynard (c.1893–1969), shearer, trade unionist and community leader

References

Populated places in the Gisborne District